Alethaxius is a genus of leaf beetles in the subfamily Eumolpinae. It is distributed from Mexico to northern South America, and it is also found in the West Indies. The genus was originally named Aletes by Félicien Chapuis in 1874. However, this name was preoccupied by Aletes Carpenter, 1857 (in Mollusca), so the genus was renamed to Alethaxius by Édouard Lefèvre in 1885. According to Flowers (1996), it is very likely that Alethaxius is polyphyletic and represents at least three different genera.

Species

 Alethaxius acunai Blake, 1947
 Alethaxius aeneus Bowditch, 1921
 Alethaxius angulicollis (Chapuis, 1874)
 Alethaxius annulicornis (Lefèvre, 1878)
 Alethaxius bogotanus (Lefèvre, 1878)
 Alethaxius bruneri Blake, 1949
 Alethaxius callosicollis Bechyné, 1953
 Alethaxius chevrolati (Lefèvre, 1891)
 Alethaxius carinipennis Bowditch, 1921
 Alethaxius darlingtoni Blake, 1945
 Alethaxius dichrous (Lefèvre, 1878)
 Alethaxius dominicae Blake, 1968
 Alethaxius geniculatus Lefèvre, 1885
 Alethaxius guatemalensis (Jacoby, 1881)
 Alethaxius hispaniolae Blake, 1945
 Alethaxius integer Blake, 1945
 Alethaxius intricatus (Lefèvre, 1878)
 Alethaxius jacobyi Weise, 1913
 Alethaxius landolti (Lefèvre, 1878)
 Alethaxius latericostatus (Lefèvre, 1882)
 Alethaxius marcuzzii Bechyné, 1958
 Alethaxius meliae Blake, 1945
 Alethaxius mexicanus (Jacoby, 1881)
 Alethaxius nigritarsis Jacoby, 1892
 Alethaxius pallidus Bowditch, 1921
 Alethaxius parumpunctatus Bechyné, 1953
 Alethaxius polychromus Bechyné, 1955
 Alethaxius prolixus Lefèvre, 1885
 Alethaxius pubicollis Jacoby, 1890
 Alethaxius puertoricensis Blake, 1945
 Alethaxius punctifer Bechyné, 1953
 Alethaxius ruffoi Bechyné, 1950
 Alethaxius semicostatus Blake, 1946
 Alethaxius semiviridis Jacoby, 1890
 Alethaxius striatulus Lefèvre, 1886
 Alethaxius tortuensis Blake, 1947
 Alethaxius tuberculifer Lefèvre, 1889
 Alethaxius turquinensis Blake, 1945
 Alethaxius vagabundus (Lefèvre, 1878)
 Alethaxius variabilis (Jacoby, 1881)
 Alethaxius yunquensis Blake, 1946

Synonyms:
 Alethaxius brevis Lefèvre, 1889: Moved to Dryadomolpus
 Alethaxius columbicus Jacoby, 1901: Moved to Rhabdocolaspis

References

Eumolpinae
Chrysomelidae genera
Beetles of North America
Beetles of South America
Insects of the Caribbean
Taxa named by Édouard Lefèvre